The "Shirazi era" refers to a mythic origin in the history of Southeast Africa (and especially Tanzania), between the 13th century and 15th century. Many Swahili in the central coastal region claim that their towns were founded by Persians from the Shiraz region in the 13th century. Once accepted as fact, modern research has disproved a Shirazi origin for the Swahili towns, instead emphasizing various social factors that induced claiming this identity.

History
The most likely origin for the stories about the Shirazi is from Muslim inhabitants of the Lamu Archipelago who moved south in the 10th and 11th centuries. They brought with them a coinage tradition and localized form of Islam. These Africans migrants seem to have developed a concept of Shirazi origin as they moved further southwards, near Malindi and Mombasa, along the Mrima coast. The longstanding trade connections with the Persian Gulf gave credence to these myths. In addition, because most Muslim societies are patrilineal, one can claim distant identities through paternal lines regardless of the composition of the majority of one's ancestry. The so-called Shirazi tradition represents the arrival of Islam in these eras, one reason it has proven so long lasting.

Extant mosques and coins demonstrate that the "Shirazi" were not Middle Eastern immigrants, but northern Swahili Muslims. They moved south, founding mosques, introducing coinage and elaborately carved inscriptions and mihrabs. They should be interpreted as indigenous African Muslims who played the politics of the Middle East to their advantage. Some still use this foundation myth a millennium later to assert their authority, even though the myth's context has long been forgotten.

The Shirazi legend took on new importance in the 19th century, during the period of Omani domination. Claims of Shirazi ancestry were used to distance locals from Arab newcomers, since Persians are not viewed as Arabs but still have an exemplary Islamic pedigree. The emphasis that the Shirazi came very long ago and intermarried with indigenous locals ties this claim to the creation of convincing indigenous narratives about Swahili heritage without divorcing it from the ideals of being a maritime-centered culture.

Heritage

One of the most important archeological sites is that of Kaole, north of Dar es Salaam. The remains of the oldest mosque in Southeast Africa can be found there.

Royal House
There is an extant Imperial Persian royal line that retain the title of Wa-Shirazi Sultans including the Sultanate of Hamamvu of the Comoros and the Sultanate of Aldabra (the current incumbent being Hutan Ashrafian).

See also
 Ali ibn al-Hassan Shirazi
 Shirazi people
 History of Tanzania

References

  Anna Rita Coppola, La storia di Kilwa dai primi insediamenti all'arrivo dei portoghesi

Precolonial Tanzania
Shirazi people
Swahili culture